"The Return of the Sorcerer" is a horror short story by American writer Clark Ashton Smith, first published in Strange Tales of Mystery and Terror in September 1931. The story ties into H. P. Lovecraft's Cthulhu Mythos due to its references to Lovecraft's invented book of occult lore the Necronomicon. It tells of one 
Mr. Ogden being hired by scholarly recluse John Carnby to translate passages from the Necronomicon.

Critical response
According to The Complete H.P. Lovecraft Filmography, "The Return of the Sorcerer" is the first published story by a writer other than Lovecraft to adopt the Cthulhu cosmology. It is the title story of Robert Weinberg's collection of Smith's short fiction, The Return of the Sorcerer: The Best of Clark Ashton Smith.

In a review of the August Derleth anthology Sleep No More, New York Times reviewer Orvile Prescott commented that the story "skates perilously close to parody of its own genre" but "should upset even hardened stomachs." A New York Times review of Out of Space and Time praised "The Return of the Sorcerer" as one of the best stories in the volume, "partly because it is one of the least overwritten". Jason Colavito singled it out in his horror genre study Knowing Fear as a standout amongst Smith's horror stories.

Media adaptation
"The Return of the Sorcerer" was adapted as an episode of the television series Night Gallery starring Vincent Price (as John Carnby) and Bill Bixby (as Noel Evans in Mr. Ogden's role). It was also adapted for radio in an episode starring Tucker Smallwood and Ron Bottitta produced for the revival of the classic radio series Suspense, which premiered on Sirius XM Radio in November 2012.

In August 2010, Finnish progressive rock band Orne and Rochester-based doom metal band Blizaro released a split 7" record based on the Night Gallery episode.

In April 2018, Cadabra Records released a vinyl LP read by Anthony D.P. Mann and scored by composer Seizon.

References

External links
 "The Return of the Sorcerer" – full text of the story 
 
 The Return of the Sorcerer: The Best of Clark Ashton Smith at Prime Books

1931 short stories
American short stories
Cthulhu Mythos short stories
Fantasy short stories
Works originally published in American magazines
Short stories by Clark Ashton Smith
Works originally published in horror fiction magazines